The Champlain River is 66.7 km long flowing on the north shore of St. Lawrence river. This river flows between Saint-Maurice River and the Batiscan River watershed, in Les Chenaux Regional County Municipality, in administrative region of Mauricie, in the province of Quebec, Canada.

Geography

Champlain River is flowing almost at the boundary between the manors of Batiscan and Champlain. Champlain river flows from north to south to empty in the St. Lawrence river at Champlain village. Champlain River rises at an altitude of about 130 meters in wetlands located at the foot of the moraine of Saint-Narcisse. Its watershed through the municipalities of Notre-Dame-du-Mont-Carmel, Trois-Rivières (Saint-Louis-de-France area), Saint-Maurice, Saint-Narcisse, Saint-Luc-de-Vincennes, Sainte-Geneviève-de-Batiscan, Batiscan and Champlain, all located, with the exception of Trois-Rivières, in the Les Chenaux Regional County Municipality.

Champlain river divides into four distinct branches that connect to the main branch. It is characterized by the presence of several meanders, a number of which are abandoned along the river near its mouth. The geographical coordinates of the mouth of the river are: -72.28194 West, 46.44695 North.

The watershed of the river Champlain is divided into five sub-basins, sub-basins upstream of the four branches of the main section, from west to east, the sub-basins of rivers Champlain (upstream) of burned with bacon and fork, and the sub-basin of the downstream portion of the Champlain River which flows in the four branches. The slope varies from 5.0 m/km in the sub-basin of the "rivière Brulée" (Burned River) to 0.7 m/km in the sub-basin of the river downstream of the Champlain portion.

Landslides 

The banks of the Champlain River are composed of marine clays, a variety that is very unstable compared to other types of clay, favoring landslides when water accumulates in the clay soil.

History of landslides in Saint-Luc-de-Vincennes]:

 1823 - Laying of clay in Leda.
 1878 - Laying of clay in Leda.
 1895 - Laying of clay at Leda; death toll of 5.
 1981 - Casting of clay in Leda.
 1986 (September) - Laying of clay in Leda, taking part of the road and vacant land.
 November 2016

A major landslide occurred on the night of November 9 to 10, 2016, on a lot of land belonging to Luc Normandin, in the Saint-Joseph-Ouest range, within the limits of Saint-Luc-de-Vincennes. The field started to move around 9.30 pm on November 9. The slip site is approximately one kilometer from the 1986 slip site, which was twice as large as the one in 2016.

The slip stopped at about ten meters from the house of Luc Normandin and its barn sheltering about sixty cattle. This natural disaster generated a large crater of the size of a baseball field, about 160 meters wide and a depth of between 2 and 10 meters, between farm buildings and the edge of the Champlain River.

Thousands of tons of clay and earth slipped into the river bed completely blocking the flow of water over several tens of meters. The water has risen to make its way again.

Two houses were evacuated and a 200-meter security perimeter was established around the crater.

Toponymy

Samuel de Champlain gave its name to this river. It is reported for the first time on the map in 1613
by Samuel de Champlain, shifted back to his card in 1632. This name, Champlain, was then given to the lordship (1664), the catholic parish (1665), the provincial county (1829), the municipality (1845) and the Federal county (1867).

The toponym "Champlain River" was officialized in the registry of places name at the Commission de toponymie du Québec as of December 5, 1968.

History

In 1863, Stanislas Drapeau Champlain wrote that "Champlain river has enough water power in order to activate flour mills and saws, and the large tannery of Mr. Richardson, living in Quebec".

About 1800, Mathew Bell built a mill having 32 saws. Burned in 1850, it was replaced by a saw mill counting 20 saws and a tannery belonging to L. Osborne Richardson. The tannery was moved to the Eastern Townships in 1875.

See also

 Champlain (disambiguation)
 Government of Trois-Rivières
 Champlain, a municipality
 Saint-Luc-de-Vincennes, a municipality
 Saint-Narcisse, Quebec, a municipality
 Saint-Maurice, Quebec, a municipality
 Champlain Fort
 Champlain (electoral district) at Federal level
 Champlain (provincial electoral district)
 St. Lawrence River
 Rivière au Lard
 Brûlée River (Champlain River)
 Noire River (Champlain River)
 Lordship of Champlain
 List of rivers of Quebec

Notes and references

Bibliography 

 René Beaudoin, «Les moulins à scie et la tannerie de la rivière Champlain» (The saw mills and tanneries of Champlain river), Le Postillon de Champlain (The Postilion of Champlain), Champlain, Champlain Historical Society, vol. 27, No. 2, April 2007, p. 21. 
 René Beaudoin, «375e anniversaire du nom de Champlain» (375th anniversary of Champlain's name), Le Postillon de Champlain (The Postilion of Champlain), Champlain, Champlain Historical Society, vol. 27, No. 3, September 2007, pages 13–16. 
 Jean-Pierre Chartier, «Les caprices d'une rivière» (The vagaries of a river), Le Postillon de Champlain (The Postilion of Champlain), Champlain, Champlain Historical Society, vol. 25, No. 2, March 2005, pp. 10–18 (first part), vol. 26, No. 1, December 2005, pp. 4–11 (second part); flight. 26, No. 2, April 2006, pp. 3–7 (third party); flight. 27, No. 1, December 2006, pp. 14–19 (Part Four) flight. 29, No. 2, April 2009, pp. 8–12 (fifth and last part). 
 Guillaume Tellier, Mylène Vallée, Isabelle Lavoie et Stéphane Campeau, Portrait du bassin versant de la rivière Champlain, Rapport déposé au Comité ZIP les Deux-Rives (Portrait of Champlain Watershed River, report tabled by ZIP Deux-Rives Committee). Trois-Rivières, Section of geography, University of Québec at Trois-Rivières, 73 pages. Available online, click here 

Rivers of Mauricie
Les Chenaux Regional County Municipality
Tributaries of the Saint Lawrence River